The Punakitere River is a river of the Northland Region of New Zealand's North Island. It is a tributary of the Waima River, though it is longer than the Waima itself. The Punakitere has its origins in several streams which flowe through and to the south of Kaikohe, and flows predominantly westward to reach the Waima close to the small settlement of Moehau.

See also
List of rivers of New Zealand

References

Far North District
Rivers of the Northland Region
Rivers of New Zealand